Endotricha niveifimbrialis is a species of snout moth in the genus Endotricha. It was described by George Hampson in 1906, and is known from Sierra Leone.

References

Moths described in 1906
Endotrichini
Insects of Cameroon
Moths of Africa